Red Bull Records is a global record label headquartered in Los Angeles, California. It is a subsidiary of the energy drink company Red Bull GmbH and has offices in Los Angeles, London, and New York. Since its inception Red Bull Records has been home to artists and bands such as Awolnation, Twin Atlantic, and Beartooth.

History
Red Bull Records was founded by Dietrich Mateschitz in 2007 with Red Bull building a recording studio in Santa Monica, California and recording small indie rock bands for free.

The label's first major success was in 2011 when Awolnation released their debut album, Megalithic Symphony which went on to become platinum certified and featured the band's most notable single "Sail", which has sold over 10 million copies to date. The single spent 79 weeks on the Billboard Hot 100 charts, making it the third longest single ever to stay on the Hot 100, surpassed only by Imagine Dragons’ "Radioactive" and The Weeknd's "Blinding Lights". The band’s sophomore release Run came in 2015 and included No. 1 hit “Hollow Moon (Bad Wolf)” as well as Top 5 tracks “I Am” and “Woman Woman.”

Red Bull Records' first international signing was Scottish rock band Twin Atlantic. The band has released four studio albums to date; Vivarium, Free, Great Divide and GLA, and band made their BBC national TV debut on Later… with Jools Holland on October 4, 2016.

In 2013, the label signed its first metalcore band Beartooth. The band was formed in 2012 by frontman Caleb Shomo in Columbus, OH, and has released four studio albums on Red Bull Records; Disgusting, Aggressive, Disease, and Below. Beartooth won the Metal Hammer Award for Best Breakthrough Band of 2016 and the Loudwire Award for Breakthrough Artist of the Year 2017. In 2020, Beartooth's single "In Between" was certified Gold in the United States.

Red Bull Records's first foray into hip hop came with signing Warm Brew. The group had participated in Red Bull’s Sound Select program before signing to the label. Warm Brew released their debut EP Diagnosis on Red Bull Records in 2016.

In 2020, Red Bull Records added Blxst to the roster. Blxst's debut EP "No Love Lost" peaked at #3 on the  Billboard Heatseekers chart.

Artists

Current artists

 The Aces
 Albert Hammond, Jr.
 Beartooth
 Blxst
 Flawes
 Gavin Haley
 Kyle Banks
 PineappleCITI 
 JUGGER
 Will Claye 
 Kofi

Former artists

 Awolnation
 August 08
 Black Gold
 Blitz Kids (Disbanded)
 Five Knives (band) (Disbanded)
 Gianna Kondor
 Heaven's Basement (Disbanded)
 Itch
 Innerpartysystem (Disbanded)
 New Beat Fund
 Twin Atlantic
 Warm Brew

Discography

 Beartooth - Below
 Albert Hammond, Jr. – Francis Trouble
 Beartooth - Disease
 August 8 - Father
 The Aces - When My Heart Felt Volcanic
 Awolnation - Here Come the Runts
 The Aces - I Don't Like Being Honest EP
 Warm Brew - Diagnosis
 Beartooth - Aggressive
 Flawes - CTRL
 Flawes - UNSPKN
 Twin Atlantic - GLA
 New Beat Fund - Sponge Fingerz
 Awolnation - Run
 Five Knives - Savages
 Beartooth - Disgusting
 Twin Atlantic - Great Divide
 Itch - The Deep End
 Five Knives - The Rising Remixes
 Blitz Kids - The Good Youth
 Beartooth - Sick EP
 New Beat Fund - Coinz
 Heaven's Basement - Filthy Empire
 Five Knives - The Rising
 Itch - Best Shot
 Awolnation - Megalithic Symphony
 Innerpartysystem - Never Be Content EP
 Twin Atlantic - Free
 Black Gold - Rush
 Twin Atlantic - Vivarium

See also
List of record labels

References

External links

American record labels
Alternative rock record labels
Companies based in Los Angeles
Record labels established in 2007
Privately held companies based in California
2007 establishments in California
Red Bull